Else Hagen (21 September 1914 – 17 August 2010) was a Norwegian visual artist.

She was born in Eydehavn, and was married to Arne E. Holm. She is known for her large decorations in public areas. Among her works are decorations in Stortinget, Tromsø Airport, the University Library in Bergen, the Norwegian School of Sport Sciences, and Postgirobygget.

When she won the competition to decorate Nøtterøy Realskole (now Borgheim School) in 1950, she became the first female artist to receive a public decoration commission in Norway.

References

1914 births
2010 deaths
People from Arendal
Norwegian artists